The 2011 GP2 Final was a special round of the 2011 GP2 Series, supporting the 2011 Abu Dhabi Grand Prix on 12 and 13 November 2011. The race was originally scheduled to be the first round of the 2012 GP2 Asia championship, but with the GP2 Asia series being discontinued and absorbed into its parent series, the race was added to the GP2 Series calendar as a non-championship round.

Entry list
As the race was a non-championship event, several teams elected to run guest drivers in the place of their regular drivers.

Notes:
  − Denotes the regular driver of that car.
  − Driver competed at selected events in the regular season.
  − Luiz Razia competed in the regular season for Caterham Team AirAsia, driving car #26.

Classification

Qualifying

Notes
 – Giacomo Ricci and Nicolas Marroc both received a ten grid place penalty for ignoring yellow flags during the practice session.

Feature Race

Notes
 – Fabio Onidi received a twenty second penalty for ignoring yellow flags during the feature race.

Sprint Race

Notes
 – Simon Trummer received a ten place grid penalty for causing a collision during the feature race.

Standings

Drivers' Championship

Teams' Standings

References

Yas Marina
Yas Marina GP2 Round, 2011
Motorsport competitions in the United Arab Emirates